The ISU World Junior Synchronized Skating Championships (WJSSC) are the junior world championships for the sport of synchronized skating. Held first time in 2013 and originally planned to be held biennially, the WJSSC is now an annual event sanctioned by the International Skating Union.

Medalists

See also
 Synchronized skating
 ISU World Synchronized Skating Championships

References

External links
 
 

'junior
Synchronized skating, Junior